The John Brown Bell, in Marlborough, Massachusetts, is a distinguished American Civil War-era bell that has been called the "second-most important bell in American history", after the Liberty Bell.

History
At one time the bell was kept in Harpers Ferry, West Virginia, In May 1861, Company I, 13th Massachusetts Infantry was on patrol in Harpers Ferry, and found the engine house where John Brown's raid ended on October 17, 1859. The bell was still in place, and knowing their hometown hook and ladder company needed a bell (many of them were firemen), they decided to take the bell, and brought it with them to Williamsport, MD.

While stationed in the town, Company I became friends with Elizabeth Ensminger who supplied them with bread. When the company was ordered to Virginia, they entrusted Elizabeth with the bell.

In September 1892, six of the original fifteen soldiers returned to Williamsport to see Elizabeth (then Snyder). They discovered that she had hung the bell in her back yard, and rang it on special occasions.

The men raised the money to bring the bell to Marlborough, where it now hangs in Union Commons Park in Marlborough, Massachusetts, and is currently located in a special tower built for the bell on Union Common in downtown Marlborough.

In 1859, abolitionist John Brown led a raid on the Harpers Ferry Armory. The raid ended when Marines under the command of Lt. Col. Robert E. Lee stormed the building. Brown and 10 of his men were later hanged for murder and treason.

Two years later, with the Civil War beginning, a Marlborough unit in the Union Army took the bell from the Harpers Ferry Armory after being ordered to seize anything of value to the U.S. government to prevent it from falling into the hands of Lee's Confederate army.

Knowing their hook and ladder company in Marlborough needed a bell, the soldiers removed the  device and got permission from the War Department to keep it.

Controversy over ownership
Over the years, citizens of Harpers Ferry have tried in vain to have the bell returned to be exhibited in the John Brown Wax Museum or the reconstructed firehouse where John Brown was captured by Col. Robert E. Lee. "In the past, several mayors have tried to have it returned, but basically it's difficult to do. "I believe the bell is wired with an alarm, so it can't be surreptitiously taken, like at night." "Oh, they've wanted it back," said Joan Abshire, a member of the Marlborough Historical Society who recently finished a comprehensive study of the bell. "When I went down there (for research), they always said, 'Well, where's the bell?" The men from Marlborough saved it from obliteration, claimed Gary Brown, chairman of the city's Historical Commission, "Had they not taken the bell, it wouldn't exist. Virtually every bell in the South was melted down for munitions."

References

Further reading
 The John Brown Bell: The journey of the second-most important bell in American history, from Harpers Ferry, West Virginia, to Marlborough, Massachusetts by Joan Abshire and available through the Marlborough Historical Society.  Published 2008.
 13th Rifle Regiment, Massachusetts Volunteers 1910 by Lysander Parker, Post 43, G.A.R. Rawlins Building Association, Marlborough, Mass.

Individual bells in the United States
Buildings and structures in Marlborough, Massachusetts
Harpers Ferry, West Virginia